Speen railway station served the village of Speen, Berkshire, UK, on the Lambourn Valley Railway.

The station had one platform with, in its later years, two small buildings, one being of the GWR's pagoda style.

History 
The station opened on 4 April 1898 as Speen for Donnington.  It was occasionally referred to by this name in official documentation until at least 1932.

Goods traffic
The station dealt with a high percentage of livestock and dairy traffic.

Closure
It closed on 4 January 1960.

References

Sources

External links
 The station on an Edwardian 25" OS map National Library of Scotland
 The branch with stations and mileages Railway Codes

Newbury, Berkshire
Lambourn Valley Railway
Disused railway stations in Berkshire
Former Great Western Railway stations
Railway stations in Great Britain opened in 1898
Railway stations in Great Britain closed in 1960